VitalityLife, alongside sister brand VitalityHealth, provide insurance services to the UK market. VitalityLife specialises in selling life insurance directly to individuals, families and businesses; via financial advisers and insurance brokers. The company is one of two sister brands that make up Vitality Corporate Services. Vitality Corporate Services is a UK based company owned by South African insurer, Discovery Limited.
Herschel Mayers, the Chief Executive Officer, heads the business’s executive team.

VitalityLife falls under one of the Vitality Group International companies. International partners include Generali (Europe), SoftBank & Sumitomo Life (Japan), Ping An Insurance (China), AIA Group (Asia and Australia), Manulife (Canada), John Hancock Financial (USA) and others.

Vitality has recently offered genetic testing to customers in South Africa and the United States and has built a business model based on psychological incentives and behavioural economics.

History  
VitalityLife initially started trading as PruProtect in 2007; as a joint venture between Prudential PLC and Discovery Limited. Prudential PLC were a long-standing UK insurer, established in London in 1848 as an Investment and Loan Association. Discovery Limited were a leading South African-based financial services group established in 1992, with aspirations to expand overseas operations and together the two launched the PruProtect brand.

In 2010, Discovery Limited increased its shareholding in PruProtect to 75% and in November 2014 they became the outright owner. Following the takeover, Discovery Limited rebranded PruProtect as VitalityLife.

Marketing
VitalityLife are sponsors of community activities which focus on wellness and being healthy. They are widely known for their collaboration agreement with Barclays Premier League football clubs – Arsenal, Manchester City and Liverpool FC.

In 2018, VitalityLife's Brand Ambassadors included:

 Ellie Simmonds
 Jessica Ennis-Hill
 Joe Root
 Jonny Wilkinson
 Maro Itoje
 Lord Sebastian Coe

Awards
2018: VitalityLife wins 2018 Celent Model Insurer Award for Operational Excellence.

References

External links 
 

Financial services companies established in 2007
Life insurance companies of the United Kingdom
Multinational joint-venture companies